Pre-Millennium Tension is the second album from English rapper and producer Tricky, released in 1996. It was a conscious effort by Tricky to depart away from the trip hop label with which critics had described his previous music. The album was well received by critics, being named the ninth best record of the year in the 1996 Pazz & Jop poll.

Background
In an October 1996 interview for Ray Gun, Tricky said he wanted to make Pre-Millennium Tension an "out-an-out punk record" to get away from the trip hop label with which his previous work had been categorized by critics. He said, "I thought it was going be heavier... What I wanted to do was a total fast album. Some of the tracks are fast and hard, but they didn't come out like that." The album was mainly recorded in Jamaica, and other parts were recorded at Platinum Islands Studio, New York. It was recorded & mixed & programmed by Ian Caple. Recorded in  Grove Studios, Ocho Rios, Jamaica & mixed at El Cortijo Studio in Spain.

According to PopMatters writer Wayne Franklin, Pre-Millennium Tension "revealed a new, more sinister sound, most likely attained due to his move to New York City and his work with underground rappers ... containing the singles "Christiansands" (the biggest hit of his career), "Tricky Kid", and "Makes Me Wanna Die" (which contains a sample of Eric B. & Rakim’s "To the Listeners")".

Critical reception

Pre-Millennium Tension received positive reviews from critics, who found the record's music ambitious, eclectic, and threatening. USA Today reviewer Elysa Gardner called it a dazzling trip hop album and Tricky "prolific, innovative and fearlessly eccentric", comparing him to American musician Prince. In the Chicago Tribune, Greg Kot said Tricky had transcended the boundaries of trip hop by drawing upon and manipulating a number of styles, including ambient, drum and bass, hip hop, and dancehall, in his evocative production. "Few records have more artfully blurred the boundaries between sensuality and terror, fascination and fear, seduction and confusion", Kot wrote. David Bennun from The Guardian argued that Tricky had deconstructed hip hop clichés and "gangsta-isms" into bizarrely malcontent songs on what was an "astonishing record – not a great one, but a very good, very awkward and very strange one". Village Voice critic Robert Christgau found his use of hip hop soundscapes compelling on a record that "comprehends and inhabits the dystopia of everyday life more radically than Wu-Tang could conceive". He qualified his praise by adding that the success of Tricky's formula relied heavily on Topley-Bird. Simon Williams of NME was less impressed, writing that the album's last few songs "seemed to suffer from the very fury which makes the rest of the record work". He singled out "My Evil Is Strong" and "Piano" for overindulging in cynical attitudes and monotonous music. David Browne was more critical in Entertainment Weekly. He believed Tricky's incorporation of more soul and reggae elements than Maxinquaye, as well as his use of spasmodic beats and "revue-style singers", had weakened his "trademark trip-hop" style and resulted in a more theatrical, "pretentious" record.

At the end of 1996, Pre-Millennium Tension was voted the ninth best album of the year in the Pazz & Jop, an annual poll of American critics nationwide. It was later included in Q magazine's "50 Heaviest Albums of All Time". In a 1997 interview between journalist Liz Jones and Prince, Jones told Prince he should listen to Tricky, because Tricky reminds her of Prince earlier in his career. Intrigued, Prince asks her the name of Tricky's latest album; she said Pre-Millennium Tension, and Prince spontaneously answered, "well, isn't that another way to say ‘1999’" (1999 being Prince's breakthrough album released in 1982.) This interview is featured in Liz Jones' book Slave to the Rhythm.

In 2017, Nate Patrin of Pitchfork noted the album's longevity, saying that the album's name "is the only obvious thing that tells you it’s two decades old rather than two weeks."

As of 2003 "Pre-Millennium Tension" has sold 218,000 copies in US. As of 1996 the album has sold 450,000 units worldwide according to Billboard.

Track listing

Charts

References

External links 
 
 Press kit for the album
 Detailed interview containing information about the album
 Interview containing some information about the album
 Article specifically about the album
 Interview containing further information about the album
 Interview regarding the album

1996 albums
Tricky (musician) albums
Island Records albums
PolyGram albums